The 1926 Iowa Hawkeyes football team represented the University of Iowa in the 1926 Big Ten Conference football season.

Schedule

References

Iowa
Iowa Hawkeyes football seasons
Iowa Hawkeyes football